Vagnozzi is a surname of Italian origin. Notable people with the surname include:

 Aldo Vagnozzi (born 1925), Italian-American politician
 Antonio Vagnozzi (contemporary), Italian astronomer
 Egidio Vagnozzi (1906–1980), Italian Roman Catholic cardinal
 Simone Vagnozzi (born 1983), Italian tennis player

Surnames of Italian origin